Sainte-Thérèse-de-Gaspé is a municipality in the Gaspésie-Îles-de-la-Madeleine region of the province of Quebec in Canada. It is the smallest municipality, in land area and population, of the Le Rocher-Percé Regional County Municipality.

Fishing is its primary business, and its harbour handles the fourth highest value of seafood in Quebec. Its factories, employing hundreds of people, process snow crab, rock crab, and lobster.

In addition to the village of Sainte-Thérèse-de-Gaspé itself, the municipality also includes the community of Saint-Isidore.

Demographics

Population

Language

See also
 List of municipalities in Quebec

References

Incorporated places in Gaspésie–Îles-de-la-Madeleine
Municipalities in Quebec